The 1996 CONCACAF Gold Cup was the third edition of the Gold Cup, the soccer championship of North America, Central America and the Caribbean (CONCACAF).

The tournament returned to the United States and California; the games were hosted by Los Angeles, San Diego, and Anaheim. The format of the tournament changed from 1993: it was expanded to nine teams, separated into three groups of three and played in January as opposed to the 1993 edition which was played in July.

The top team in each group, plus the best second-place finisher would advance to the semifinals. For the first time, a non-CONCACAF team was invited: Brazil, who sent their under-23 side. Mexico won their second straight Gold Cup, beating the Brazilians 2–0 in the final.

Qualified teams

Venues

Squads

The 9 national teams involved in the tournament were required to register a squad of 20 players; only players in these squads were eligible to take part in the tournament.

Group stage

Group A

Group B

Group C

Knockout stage

Bracket

Semifinals

Third place match

Final

Statistics

Goalscorers
4 goals
 Eric Wynalda
3 goals
 Caio Ribeiro
 Luis García Postigo
2 goals

 Paulo Jamelli
 Sávio
 Kevin Holness
 Raúl Díaz Arce
 Cuauhtémoc Blanco
 Ricardo Peláez
 Arnold Dwarika
 Russell Latapy

1 goal

 Leandro Machado
 André Luiz Moreira
 Carlo Corazzin
 Tomasz Radzinski
 Ronald Cerritos
 Juan Manuel Funes
 Martín Machón
 Edwin Westphal
 Presley Carson
 Agustín Garcia
 Eustacio Rizo
 Jeff Agoos
 Marcelo Balboa
 Jovan Kirovski
 Joe-Max Moore

Own goals
 Marcelo Balboa for Brazil

Awards

References

External links
Lineups/Squads

 
Gold Cup
CONCACAF Gold Cup 1996
CONCACAF Gold Cup
CONCACAF Gold Cup tournaments
CONCACAF Gold